is a Shinto shrine located in the city of Iga, Mie Prefecture, Japan. It is the Ichinomiya of the former Iga Province and claims to have been founded in the seventh century. It is classified as a Beppo Shrine by the Association of Shinto Shrines.

Enshrined kami
The kami enshrined at Aekuni Jinja are:
 , son Emperor Kōgen, deployed to Hokurikudo as one of the Shido Shogun.
 , kami of agriculture, healing, magic, brewing sake and knowledge
 , kami from the Nangū Taisha

About the Kami 
According to the Engishiki, there used to be only one god. According to the Rikkokushi, the name of this god is Aekunishin-kami (敢国津神). This god's essence maintained power throughout the entire region, together with the Abe clan's patron god, dedicating Mt. Nangu as a place of worship.

During the Muromachi Period, a theory arose that Kanayamahiko was assigned to Aekunishin as a personal god. Soon after, a secondary theory arose stating that the god assigned was actually Sukunabikona. The Kanayamahiko assignment theory, in relation to Mt. Nangu, is rooted in religious documents, as it is mentioned in both the Dainipponkoku Ichinomiyaki and the Engishiki Jinmeicho from the late Muromachi Period. There is also literature written down of folklore related to Mino Province's ichinomiya, Nangu Taisha (modern day Gifu Prefecture, Fuwa District, Tarui), but the evidence and details are lacking. On the other hand, Sukunabikona, also known as the pioneer god, resembles the Iga Province's Osanakichigo-no-Miya from the Ryojin Hisho. This theory is believed to have been established around the end of the Heian Period. After that, from the end of the Muromachi Period to the mid. Edo Period, the two theories of Kanayamahime and Sukunabikona, and the three theories introducing Koga Saburo were established.

In the third year of the Shotoku Era (1713 AD), it was advocated that Prince Ohiko was actually the god enshrined at Aekuni Shrine. This proposition was based on the fact that in both the Nihon Shoki and the Shinsen Shojiroku , Prince Ohiko is described as the founder of the Aya clan. Afterwards, the Prince Ohiko theory was adopted, and Koga Saburo was abolished from the pantheon.

History
As with most Shinto shrines of ancient origin, the story of the shrine's founding is vague, contradictory and lacking in historical documentation. According to the shrine's own myth, it was founded by order of  Empress Kōgyoku in 658 AD. The principal kami, Ōhiko-no-mikoto was the son of the semi-legendary Emperor Kōgen (reigned 214 to 157 BC). Per the Nihon Shoki and Kojiki, he was a general sent to conquer the Hokuriku region for Yamato, and was the ancestor of the Abe clan. After his return to Yamato, he was granted estates in the Asai District of Iga Province, where he eventually died and was buried in a kofun.  The secondary kami, Sukunabikona is connected with the immigrant Hata clan, who were also living in this area. The shrine was originally located on the summit of Mount Nangū to the south, and was later relocated to its present site at the foot of the mountain. During the Heian period, another secondary kami, Kanayamahime, from the Nangū Taisha in Gifu Prefecture was moved to the old shrine at the summit of the mountain, hence where the name "Mount Nangū" originated. In the second year of the Jōgan Era (977 AD) mysterious words appeared, burned into the shinboku of the shrine at the summit. According to the words, Kanayamahime had moved to Aekuni Shrine at the foot of the mountain.

The shrine is listed in the Nihon Montoku Tennō Jitsuroku of 850 AD, Nihon Sandai Jitsuroku of 864 AD and the Engishiki records of 927 AD, and in the late Heian period Genpei Jōsuiki, it is called the "Ichinomiya Nangū Dai-Bosatsu". During the Nanboku-cho period, Southern Court Emperor Go-Murakami spent several days at the shrine and awarded it with an estate. However, during the 1579 Tenshō Iga War, the shrine was burned down by the forces of Oda Nobunaga. It was reconstructed in 1593 by yamabushi. In the Edo period, with construction of Iga Ueno Castle, the shrine was reconstructed in 1621 by order of Tōdō Takatora, as it protected the spiritually vulnerable northeast quadrant of the castle.

It is believed that part of the original worship around Aekuni Shrine was the worship of Mount Nangū itself, as 200 meters south of Aekuni Shrine is a large boulder believed to be iwakura. Currently, this boulder has been lost, however, a kofun has been found in the vicinity, along with evidence of the enshrining of a great stone god. It is believed that this same stone god is being worshiped at Aekuni Shrine's Oishi-sha.

Shrine structures 

 Honden
 Haiden
 Heiden
 Emaden
 Shamusho
 Momotaro Rock

Auxiliary/branch shrines

Auxiliary shrines 

 Rokusho-sha - On the eastern side of the main shrine
 Kusho-sha - On the western side of the main shrine

Branch shrines 

 Wakamiya Hachiman-sha
 Kosazuke-sha (Shrine for conception)
 Shinmei-sha
 Kusunoki-sha (Shrine of the camphor tree)
 Musubi-sha (Shrine for marriage)
 Oishi-sha (Great stone shrine)
 Ichikishima jinja
 Asama-sha - The shrine that rests by Mt. Nangu’s summit

Festivals
 Every Month
 Monthly festival (Held on the first of every month)
 January
 New Year’s Day Festival (January 1)
 First Ceremony of the Dancing Lion (January 3)
 Festival of Reverence for Worshipers (January 11)
 February
 Festival of Prayer for Warding off Evil (February 3)
 Kigensai (February 11)
 Prayer Festival (February 17)
 Great Stone Shrine’s Festival of Prayer (February 17)
 April
 Great Festival of Spring (April 17)
 Festival of the Dancing Lion (April 17)
 Great Stone Shrine’s Spring Festival (April 24)
 Ichinomiya District’s Prayer Festival for Traffic Safety (April 24)
 June
 The Association’s Annual Festival (4th Sunday of June)
 Great Purification Festival (June 30)
 July
 Great Stone Shrine’s Gion Festival (July 28)
 August
 Shinto Ritual for the Circle of Thatch (August 1)
 September
 Ichinomiya District’s Respect for the Elderly Festival (First Sunday of September)
 Memorial service for those who have died related to the shrine (September 21)
 October
 Kosha Grand Festival (The Sunday near October 10)
 November
 The Emperor’s Harvest Ceremony (November 23)
 Kokutou-sai (November 25)
 December
 Asama Shrine Festival (December 1)
 Idol Procession Festival (December 4)
 Habitual Festival (December 5)
 The Emperor’s Birthday (December 23)
 Great Purification Festival (December 30)
 New Year’s Eve (December 31)
 Full Moon Festival (Every full moon)
Kagura is performed at Aekuni Shrine’s Festivals of the Dancing Lion on January 3 and April 17, and at the annual shrine festival on December 5. It is said that kagura originated in the Keicho Era (1596 - 1615 AD). Across various parts of Iga are models of the lion kagura, and they have been designated a genuine intangible traditional cultural property of Mie Prefecture.

Cultural properties

Cultural properties of Mie Prefecture 

 Tangible cultural properties
 12 frames of paintings of the 36 Immortals of Poetry
 Paintings of the 36 Immortals of Poetry have been divided among twelve frames. It seems that the paintings were part of an article from “Koushitsu Nenpu Ryaku” in the 14th year of the Keicho Era (1609 AD), but the same article can be found in “Yamatoku”, in which the creator is wrongly attributed to be Kano Sanraku. The paintings are actually Konoe Nobutada’s brushwork. They were designated on March 17th, 2005.
 Intangible cultural properties
 Aekuni Shrine’s Lion Dance. It was designated on April 1st, 1954.

Cultural properties of Iga City 

 Tangible cultural properties
 Yugama iron craftwork - Dedicated in the third year of the Keicho Era (1598). It was designated on November 22nd, 1958.
 Stone lantern craftwork - It was designated on February 26th, 2004.

Local information

Location 

 877 Ichinomiya, Iga City, Mie Prefecture

Transportation access 

 Bus
 From the “Sindo Station South Exit” bus stop in front of Shindo Station (JR West Japan Kansai Main Line), take the Mie Kotsu bus (heading for the Ueno Industry Meeting Hall) and get off at the “Aekuni Shrine” stop
 From the “Ueno Industry Meeting Hall” bus stop in front of Uenoshi Station (Iga Railway Iga Line), take the Mie Kotsu bus (heading for the Iga branch office) and get off at the “Aekuni Shrine” stop
 Car
 Off Meihan National Highway (National Highway no. 25 Bypass), immediately from the Iga Ichinomiya Interchange

See also
Mihakayama Kofun
List of Shinto shrines
ichinomiya

Related literature 

 『古事類苑』Imperial Shrine, Aekuni Shrine
 『古事類苑 第9冊』(National Diet Library Digital Collection) Refer to frames 168-171
 Anzu Motohiko's『神道辞典』Shrine News, 1968, p.1
 『神社辞典』published by Tokyodo, 1979, p.3

References

External links 

 Official home page 
https://www.kankomie.or.jp/spot/detail_2965.html Mie Prefecture Official tourist information site] 
Iga-Ueno Official tourist information site 

Shinto shrines in Mie Prefecture
Ichinomiya
Iga Province
Iga, Mie
   Beppyo shrines